Deh-e Ali Khan (also Romanized as Deh-e ‘Alī Khān and Deh ‘Alī Khān) is a village in Malmir Rural District, Sarband District, Shazand County, Markazi Province, Iran. At the 2006 census, its population was 89, in 27 families.

References 

Populated places in Shazand County